Sigli is a town in Aceh province of Indonesia.

Sigli may also refer to
Sigli village, Dehradun, a village in India